The Anthology... So Far is a triple live compilation album by English rock musician Ringo Starr and his All Starr Band. It was released in the United Kingdom on 5 February 2001 by Eagle Records and on 24 July in the United States by Koch Records. The album includes material from 1990's Ringo Starr and His All-Starr Band, 1993's Ringo Starr and His All Starr Band Volume 2: Live from Montreux and 1997's Ringo Starr and His Third All-Starr Band Volume 1, along with previously unreleased live recordings from 1995, 1997 and 2000.

The live anthology includes songs performed by Starr's bandmates from the various line-ups of the All-Starr tours between 1989 and 2000. Among these artists are Randy Bachman, Gary Brooker, Jack Bruce, Eric Carmen, Felix Cavaliere, Clarence Clemons, Burton Cummings, Rick Danko, Dr. John, Dave Edmunds, John Entwistle, Mark Farner, Peter Frampton, Levon Helm, Jim Keltner, Simon Kirke, Nils Lofgren, Billy Preston, Todd Rundgren, Timothy B. Schmit and Joe Walsh.

Track listing

References 
Footnotes

Citations

2001 live albums
Ringo Starr live albums
Eagle Records live albums